Charleston Diggler (born June 27, 1974) is an American professional wrestler, best known by his ring name Ace Darling. Darling has wrestled in various independent promotions in Pennsylvania, New Jersey, and Delaware, most notably for the East Coast Wrestling Association, Jersey All Pro Wrestling, World Wrestling Federation, World Championship Wrestling and Extreme Championship Wrestling.

Championships and accomplishments
Bloody Rage American Wrestling League
BRAWL American Heavyweight Championship (1 time)
Century Wrestling Alliance
CWA Tag Team Championship (1 time) – with Devon Storm
East Coast Pro Wrestling
ECPW Tag Team Championship (1 time) – with Devon Storm
East Coast Wrestling Association
ECWA Heavyweight Championship (1 time)
ECWA Mid Atlantic Championship (4 times)
ECWA Tag Team Championship (3 times) – with Kid Flash (1), Devon Storm (1) and Striker (1)
Super 8 Tournament (1997)
ECWA Hall of Fame (Class of 1996)
Empire Wrestling Alliance
EWA Heavyweight Championship (1 time)
Eternity Wrestling Association
EWA Tag Team Championship (1 time) – with Devon Storm
Garden State Wrestling Alliance
GSWA Heavyweight Championship (1 time)
Independent Superstars of Pro Wrestling
ISPW Heavyweight Championship (3 times)
Jersey Championship Wrestling
JCW Championship (1 time)
JCW Television Championship (1 time)
JCW Tag Team Championships (1 time) – with Striker
National Wrestling Alliance
NWA North American Heavyweight Championship (1 time)
NWA 2000
NWA 2000 Tag Team Championship (1 time) – with Devon Storm
NWA New Jersey
NWA United States Tag Team Championship (New Jersey version) (1 time) – with Devon Storm
NWA World Light Heavyweight Championship (New Jersey version) (1 time)
NWA New York
NWA New York Tag Team Championship (1 time) – with Devon Storm
NWA New York Television Championship (1 time)
National Wrestling Superstars
NWS Tag Team Championship (2 times) – with Shane Taylor
New Jack City Wrestling
NJCW Light Heavyweight Championship (2 times)
Richmond Championship Wrestling
RCW Tag Team Championship (1 time) – with Devon Storm
Pennsylvania Championship Wrestling
PCW America's Heavyweight Championship (2 times)
PCW Tag Team Championship (1 time) – with Mark Mest / Glen Osbourne1
Pro Wrestling Illustrated
PWI ranked him #125 of the 500 best singles wrestlers in the PWI 500 in 1997
World Wide Wrestling Alliance
WWWA Light Heavyweight Championship (1 time)

1After throwing Mest out of the team, Darling chose Glen Osbourne as a replacement without interrupting the championship reign.

References

External links

1975 births
American male professional wrestlers
Living people
People from Brick Township, New Jersey
People from Wildwood, New Jersey
NWA North American Heavyweight Champions